The 1823 Connecticut gubernatorial election was held on April 10, 1823. Incumbent governor and Toleration Party candidate Oliver Wolcott Jr. won re-election with 88.96% of the vote.

General election

Candidates
Major candidates

Oliver Wolcott Jr., Toleration

Minor candidates

Zephaniah Swift, Federalist
Timothy Pitkin, Federalist

Results

References

1823
Connecticut
Gubernatorial